Theresa "Tay" Malarkey (1889-1973) was an American film editor who worked at Triangle and Famous Players-Lasky in the late 1920s and early 1930s.

Biography 
Tay was born in Girardville, Pennsylvania, to John Malarkey and Mary Joyce, both of whom were Irish immigrants. She was the youngest of the couple's nine children.

After working as a stenographer in the real estate industry in San Antonio in her teens, she moved to Hollywood and took on a similar role at a film studio. Eventually she worked her way into an editing role.

Malarkey—who never married—died on April 15, 1973.

Selected filmography 

 No Limit (1931)
 Close Harmony (1929)
 Three Week Ends (1928)
 Hot News (1928)

References 

1889 births
1973 deaths
American film editors
American women film editors